Marvin Turpin (born 1 November 1885, date of death unknown) was a Guyanese cricketer. He played in three first-class matches for British Guiana in 1908/09 and 1909/10.

See also
 List of Guyanese representative cricketers

References

External links
 

1885 births
Year of death missing
Guyanese cricketers
Guyana cricketers
Sportspeople from Georgetown, Guyana